

Description
The length of the shell varies between  25 mm and 50 mm.

Distribution
This marine species has a wide distribution and occurs from KwaZulu-Natal, South Africa to the Gulf of Oman and  Western India.

Strigatella subruppelli is a species of sea snail, a marine gastropod mollusk, in the family Mitridae, the miters or miter snails.

References

 Finlay, H. J. (1927). New specific names for Austral Mollusca. Transactions of the New Zealand Institute. 57: 488-533.

External links
 Gastropods.com: Strigatella subruppelli
 Sowerby III, G. B. (1914). Descriptions of new Mollusca from New Caledonia, Japan, Philippines, China, and West Africa. Annals and Magazine of Natural History. ser. 8, 14: 475-480, pl. 19.
  Fedosov A., Puillandre N., Herrmann M., Kantor Yu., Oliverio M., Dgebuadze P., Modica M.V. & Bouchet P. (2018). The collapse of Mitra: molecular systematics and morphology of the Mitridae (Gastropoda: Neogastropoda). Zoological Journal of the Linnean Society. 183(2): 253-337

subruppelli
Gastropods described in 1927